Alex Ogbongbemiga (born March 2, 1993) is a Canadian football linebacker for the BC Lions of the Canadian Football League (CFL). He played college football at Calgary.

College career
Ogbongbemiga red shirted at the University of Houston during the 2010 season before spending three seasons at the University of Calgary (2011–13). In 17 games, he recorded 26.5 defensive tackles and three tackles for a loss. The team won back-to-back-to-back Hardy Cups as Canada West champions in 2011, 2012 and 2013.

Junior career
Spent the 2015 season with the Calgary Colts of the Canadian Junior Football League. He recorded 20 defensive tackles and one quarterback sack in four games.

Professional career
On the Eskimos practice roster. Activated in Week 10 and played in nine games (one start), recording two special teams tackles. He also had one kickoff return. Ogbongbemiga was on the active roster for both the Eastern Semi-Final and Final. (Saskatchewan) Made his CFL debut on July 16. Traded to Edmonton from Saskatchewan on Aug. 8, 2016 in exchange for national defensive tackle Gregory Alexandre.

He signed a free agent contract with the BC Lions in June 2017.

References

External links
 Edmonton Eskimos profile

1993 births
Living people
Edmonton Elks players
Sportspeople from Lagos
Nigerian emigrants to Canada
Yoruba sportspeople
Saskatchewan Roughriders players
University of Calgary alumni
Calgary Dinos football players
Nigerian players of Canadian football
Canadian football fullbacks
BC Lions players